Ty Gwyn is a large detached house in the Cardiff suburb of Lisvane. It is set in 5 acres of grounds and is 10,000sq ft in size.

It was built by the builder James E. Turner as his personal residence in 1906 in the Jacobethan style. Turner was the senior partner of the Cardiff building firm E. Turner and Sons. The company built much of the Cathays Park civic centre of Cardiff. The house is constructed of Portland stone; with interior furnishings of wainscot panelling made from Austrian oak. A one-storey extension to the rear of the main house has gothic detailing and dates from 1932. It is Grade II listed. The house was illustrated in the 1929 pamphlet Superb Buildings which depicted E. Turner and Sons' projects in Cardiff. The house has been listed Grade II since September 2002. Its gardens are designated Grade II* on the Cadw/ICOMOS Register of Parks and Gardens of Special Historic Interest in Wales.

On 2 and 3 July 1908 a garden fête was held at Ty Gwyn to raise funds for the construction of the Baptist Chapel at Llanishen. The fete was opened by the Liberal MP Alfred Thomas. Entertainment was provided by the artistes of Clara Novello Davies, the Llanishen Brass Band and the Capel Gwilym Choir. The house was purchased by the shipping merchant Doug Smith, of the Reardon Smith Shipping Company in 1937. To survey his ships in the Bristol Channel, Smith constructed an octagonal room on the roof of Ty Gwyn.

Ty Gwyn was bought by the banker and financier Julian Hodge in 1961. It was the site of his charitable foundation, that was named for his mother, Jane.

In 2014 Ty Gwyn was put up for sale for the first time in 50 years, with an asking price of £3 million. It was sold in November 2017 for £2 million. A dayroom, cinema, gym and a garage for four cars was added to the house by Davis Sutton Architects following its sale in 2015. A new entrance to the house was created after the separation of the coach house and gate lodge. The coach house of Ty Gwyn was developed as a private residence in the 2010s. It is believed to have the first vehicle inspection pit in Wales. It has a datestone of 1905 and decorative tiles on the external walls.

References

Grade II listed buildings in Cardiff
Grade II listed houses in Wales
Houses completed in 1906
Jacobethan architecture
Registered historic parks and gardens in Cardiff